Miss Earth USA 2022 was the 18th edition of the Miss Earth USA pageant held on January 8, 2022 in Orlando, Florida. Marisa Butler of Maine crowned Natalia Salmon of Pennsylvania as her successor at the end of the event, but she later lost the title for unknown reasons. Brielle Simons of Connecticut Miss Water (2nd runner-up) has crowned the new Miss Earth USA after Miss Air (1st runner-up) Faith Porter, who had already ascended the title of Miss District of Columbia USA 2022, and Simmons will now represent the United States at Miss Earth 2022.

Results

Delegates
51 contestants participated:

References

External links
 

Miss Earth United States
Beauty pageants in the United States
Earth USA 2022
2022 in the United States